Archebius Dikaios Nikephoros (epithets mean respectively, "the Just", "the Victorious"; formerly read as "Archelius") was an Indo-Greek king who ruled in the area of Taxila. Osmund Bopearachchi dates him to c. 90–80 BCE, and R. C. Senior to about the same period. He was probably one of the last Indo-Greek kings before the Saka king Maues conquered Taxila, and a contemporary of Hermaeus in the west. He may have been a relative of Heliokles II, who used a similar reverse and also the title Dikaios.

Coin types
Archebius issued silver with diademed or helmeted king, sometimes in spear-throwing pose. On the reverse is Zeus standing facing, holding a thunderbolt or on some issues an aegis.

Archebius also struck a rare series of Attic tetradrachms, found in Bactria.

He issued bronzes with an owl / Nike.

Overstrikes
Archebius overstruck two coins of Peukolaos.

References

 The Shape of Ancient Thought. Comparative studies in Greek and Indian Philosophies by Thomas McEvilley (Allworth Press and the School of Visual Arts, 2002) 
 Buddhism in Central Asia by B. N. Puri (Motilal Banarsidass Pub, January 1, 2000) 
 The Greeks in Bactria and India by W. W. Tarn, Cambridge University Press.

External links
Coins of Archebius
More Coins of Archebios

Indo-Greek kings
1st-century BC rulers in Asia